Kahrizeh-ye Ali Aqa (also Romanized as Kahrīzeh-ye ʿAlī Āqā; also known as Kahrīzeh) is a village in Akhtachi Rural District, in the Central District of Bukan County, West Azerbaijan Province, Iran. At the 2006 census, its population was 218, in 28 families.

References 

Populated places in Bukan County